Chenne is an Indian given name. Also it may refer to:
 Chenne Mane, game
 Chenne Kothapalle, village
 List of aircraft (D)#de Chenne
 Chennes